Ernest Urtasun i Domènech (born 27 January 1982) is a Spanish ecosocialist politician. He serves as Member of the European Parliament since 2014, integrated within the Greens–European Free Alliance (Greens/EFA) political group.

Biography 
Born on 27 January 1982 in Barcelona, Urtasun joined , the youth wing of Initiative for Catalonia Greens (ICV), when he was 15 years old. He earned a licentiate degree in Economics from the Autonomous University of Barcelona (UAB), followed by a postgraduate degree in international relations from the University of Barcelona (UB).

He ran 6th in the Initiative for Catalonia Greens–United and Alternative Left–Entesa pel Progrés Municipal (ICV–EUiA–EPM) list for the 2003 Barcelona municipal election and the 2007 municipal election. He also ran as candidate to the European Parliament (EP) for the 2004 European Parliament election in Spain, 28th in the United Left–Initiative for Catalonia Greens–United and Alternative Left (IU–ICV–EUiA) list.

Between 2004 and 2008 Urtasun worked as adviser for MEP Raül Romeva. Later, he began working as a diplomat at the Ministry of Foreign Affairs and Cooperation and in 2011 became director of the general secretariat of the international organization Union for the Mediterranean. Since 2012, he has been member of the trade union Comisiones Obreras.

In 2009, Urtasun ran as candidate to the European Parliament (EP), 33rd in the list of The Left for the May 2009 european election in Spain.

For the European elections in 2014, Urtasun was elected as his party lead candidate in a primary election in which he defeated Salvador Milà. He was ultimately included in the third place of the Plural Left coalition list. After his election to the European Parliament, he became a member of the Greens/EFA political group. He served in the Committee on Economic and Monetary Affairs (ECON) and the Committee on Women's Rights and Gender Equality (FEMM), also joining the Delegation to the Euro-Latin American Parliamentary Assembly (DLAT) and the Delegation for relations with the countries of Central America (DCAM).

After the 2019 european elections, in which he ran under the Unidas Podemos Cambiar Europa banner, he was appointed as Greens/EFA deputy chairman, under the leadership of co-chairs Ska Keller and Philippe Lamberts. He repeated as member of the ECON and the FEMM committees and he also joined the Delegation for relations with Iran (D–IR).

In December 2020, Urtasun received the Economics & Monetary Affairs, Taxation & Budgets award at The Parliament Magazine's annual MEP Awards.

References

1982 births
Living people
MEPs for Spain 2014–2019
Initiative for Catalonia Greens MEPs
Autonomous University of Barcelona alumni
University of Barcelona alumni
MEPs for Spain 2019–2024